is a Japanese long-distance runner. He competed in the marathon at the 1968 Summer Olympics.

Sasaki achieved a personal best in the marathon of 2:11:17, set in the 1967 Fukuoka Marathon, finishing second behind Derek Clayton, who ran 2:09:36.4, a world record for the marathon distance at that time. Sasaki's performance in this marathon was the second fastest in history up to that time.

References

1945 births
Living people
Athletes (track and field) at the 1968 Summer Olympics
Japanese male long-distance runners
Japanese male marathon runners
Olympic athletes of Japan
Sportspeople from Saga Prefecture